The M. E. Doe House, at Dearborn and Montgomery Streets in Philipsburg, Montana, was built in 1902.  It was listed on the National Register of Historic Places in 1986.

It is a two-story wood-frame house.  It features a one-story conical turret at its northeast corner and a porch which wraps around three sides of the house.

It was built for Marshall Doe, who operated a druggist business from 1885 for at least 20 years, and who bought land which became the Doe & Morse Addition.

References

External links

National Register of Historic Places in Granite County, Montana
Victorian architecture in Montana
Houses completed in 1902
Houses on the National Register of Historic Places in Montana
1902 establishments in Montana